James John Patrick Murphy (September 25, 1947 – May 1, 2022) was an American author. He wrote more than 35 nonfiction and fiction books for children, young adults, and general audiences, including more than 30 about American history. He won the Margaret A. Edwards Award from the American Library Association in 2010 for his contribution in writing for teens.

Early life
Murphy was born in Newark, New Jersey, on September 25, 1947. His father, James K. Murphy, was employed as an accountant; his mother, Helen Irene, worked as bookkeeper and artist. Murphy was raised in St. Stephen's parish in nearby Kearny. He studied English literature, history, and art history at Rutgers University, graduating with a Bachelor of Arts in 1970. He also set records while competing in track and field for the Scarlet Knights. Murphy finished the Radcliffe Publishing Course in the summer of 1970.

Career
After graduation, Murphy was employed in construction by his uncle. He then worked as an assistant editorial secretary at Seabury Press (which ultimately became Clarion Books) in New York City. He was eventually promoted to managing editor, before quitting in 1977 to become a full-time writer. He published his first book, Weird & Wacky Inventions, one year later, having initially written a manuscript for a fictional work that went into thousands of pages before discarding it in favor of nonfiction.

Murphy ultimately authored over 35 books for children and youths throughout his career. One of his early works, Tractors (1984), paved the way for his prevailing writing style of employing first-hand accounts and concentrating on the individuals involved in an event, instead of the event itself. This approach was evident in The Boys' War (1990) and Truce (2009), both of which showed the horrors of war using eyewitness reports from letters, journal entries, oral testimonies, and historic images.

Personal life
Murphy's first marriage was to Elaine Kelso. They eventually divorced. He later married Alison Blank in 1987. They met while working for Seabury Press and remained married until his death. Together, they had two children: Michael and Ben. Murphy and Blank were co-authors of Invincible Microbe: Tuberculosis and the Never-Ending Search for a Cure, published by Clarion in 2012.

Murphy died on May 1, 2022, at his home in Woodstock, New York. He was 74; the cause of death was not known.

Awards
The ALA Margaret A. Edwards Award recognizes one writer and a particular body of work for "significant lasting contribution to young-adult literature". Murphy won the annual award in 2010, citing five nonfiction books published from 1992 to 2003: The Long Road to Gettysburg, The Great Fire, A Young Patriot, Blizzard! The Storm That Changed America, and An American Plague: The True and Terrifying Story of the Yellow Fever Epidemic of 1793 (‡). According to the citation, "Murphy's well-researched books bring history alive through multiple narratives involving young people. Primary sources, maps, photos, illustrations and dialogue reveal the drama of historical events, making Murphy's books fast-paced reading of particular interest for young adults. The reader participates in the lives of these individuals and the events that shaped history."

Beside the Edwards Award for lifetime achievement in young-adult literature, the American librarians have named Murphy a runner-up for annual Newbery Medals twice, in 1996 for The Great Fire and in 2004 for An American Plague. The Newbery is the ALA's premier book award for children's literature.

Murphy won the ALA award for children's information books, the Robert F. Sibert Medal, for The American Plague in 2004 and he was a runner-up for BLIZZARD! in 2001. The American Plague was also a finalist for the 2003 National Book Award for Young People's Literature.

Murphy also won three NCTE Orbis Pictus Awards, three Jefferson Cup Awards, two SCBWI Golden Kite Awards, The Washington Post/Children's Book Guild Award for Distinguished Nonfiction, and the Boston Globe–Horn Book Award. In 2013 he received the Anne V. Zarrow Award for Young Readers' Literature, presented by the Tulsa Library Trust.

Selected works

Nonfiction

Weird & Wacky Inventions (Crown Publishers, 1978) 
The Boys' War: Confederate and Union soldiers talk about the Civil War (Clarion Books, 1990) 
The Long Road to Gettysburg (Clarion, 1992) 
Across America on an Emigrant Train (Clarion, 1993) —incorporating an adaptation of Robert Louis Stevenson's account
The Great Fire (Scholastic Corporation, 1995) 
A Young Patriot: The American Revolution as Experienced by One Boy (Clarion, 1995) —evidently an adaptation of Joseph Plumb Martin's account
Gone a-whaling: the lure of the sea and the hunt for the great whale (Clarion, 1998) 
Blizzard! The Storm That Changed America (Scholastic, 2000) 
An American Plague: the true and terrifying story of the yellow fever epidemic of 1793 (Clarion, 2003) 
Inside the Alamo (Delacorte Books, 2003) 
Desperate Journey (Scholastic, 2006) —delivering goods by barge on the Erie Canal
The Real Benedict Arnold (Clarion, 2007) 
A Savage Thunder: Antietam and the bloody road to freedom (Margaret K. McElderry Books, 2009) 
Truce: the day the soldiers stopped fighting (Scholastic, 2009) 
The Crossing: How George Washington Saved the American Revolution (Scholastic, 2010) 
The Giant and How He Humbugged America (Scholastic, 2012) 
Invincible Microbe: Tuberculosis and the Never-Ending Search for a Cure, by Murphy and Alison Blank (Clarion, 2012)

Fiction

Horror
 Night Terrors (Scholastic, 1994)

Children's picture books
 The Last Dinosaur, illustrated by Mark Alan Weatherby (Scholastic, 1988) 
 The Call of the Wolves, illus. Weatherby (Scholastic, 1989)

Dear America books
 My Face to the Wind: the diary of Sarah Jane Price, a prairie teacher (Scholastic, 2001) 
 The Journal of James Edmond Pease, a Civil War Union Soldier (Scholastic, 1998) 
 West to a Land of Plenty : the diary of Teresa Angelino Viscardi (Scholastic, 1998) 
 The Journal of Brian Doyle: a greenhorn on an Alaskan whaling ship (Scholastic, 2003)

See also

References

External links
 
 Jim Murphy papers, MSS 2244 at L. Tom Perry Special Collections, Brigham Young University

1947 births
2022 deaths
20th-century American historians
20th-century American male writers
20th-century American novelists
21st-century American historians
21st-century American male writers
21st-century American novelists
American children's writers
American historical novelists
American male non-fiction writers
American male novelists
Children's non-fiction writers
People from Kearny, New Jersey
People from Newark, New Jersey
Writers from New Jersey
Margaret A. Edwards Award winners
Robert F. Sibert Informational Book Medal winners
Newbery Honor winners